QFX may refer to:

QFX (program), a computer image editing program
QFX (band), a Scottish techno band
QFX (file format), "Quicken Financial Exchange" file format used by Intuit software